Na konci města  is a 1955 Czechoslovak drama film, directed by Miroslav Cikán. It stars Miloš Nedbal, Gustav Heverle, and Vlasta Vlasáková.

References

External links
Na konci města  at the Internet Movie Database

1955 films
Czechoslovak drama films
1955 drama films
Films directed by Miroslav Cikán
Czechoslovak black-and-white films
1950s Czech films